Piezogaster is a genus of leaf-footed bugs in the family Coreidae. There are at least 30 described species in Piezogaster.

Species
These 33 species belong to the genus Piezogaster:

 Piezogaster achillelus Brailovsky and Barrera, 2000 i c g
 Piezogaster achilles (Stål, 1862) i c g
 Piezogaster acuminatus Brailovsky, 1993 i c g
 Piezogaster ashmeadi (Montandon, 1899) i c g
 Piezogaster auriculatus (Stål, 1862) i c g
 Piezogaster basilicus Brailovsky and Barrera, 1984 i c g
 Piezogaster bolivianus Brailovsky, 1993 i c g
 Piezogaster calcarator (Fabricius, 1803) i c g b
 Piezogaster camposi (Montandon, 1897) i c g
 Piezogaster chiriquinus (Distant, 1892) i c g
 Piezogaster chontalensis (Distant, 1892) i c g
 Piezogaster congruus Brailovsky, 1984 i c g
 Piezogaster dilatatus (Dallas, 1852) i c g
 Piezogaster herrichi (Blöte, 1938) i c g
 Piezogaster humeralis (Distant, 1901) i c g
 Piezogaster humerosus (Distant, 1892) i c g
 Piezogaster indecorus (Walker, 1871) i c g b
 Piezogaster lacrimiferous Brailovsky, 2001 i c g
 Piezogaster loricata (Distant, 1892) i c g
 Piezogaster multispinus (Stål, 1862) i c g
 Piezogaster oblatus Brailovsky, 2001 i c g
 Piezogaster obscuratus (Montandon, 1899) i c g
 Piezogaster odiosus (Stål, 1862) i c g
 Piezogaster orbicularis Brailovsky, 2001 i c g
 Piezogaster reclusus Brailovsky and Barrera, 2000 i c g
 Piezogaster rubronotatus (Stål, 1862) i c g
 Piezogaster rubropictus (Montandon, 1897) i c g
 Piezogaster scitus Brailovsky and Barrera, 1984 i c g
 Piezogaster scutellaris Stål, 1862 i c g
 Piezogaster spurcus (Stål, 1862) i c g b
 Piezogaster tetricus (Stål, 1862) i c g
 Piezogaster thoracicus (Distant, 1881) i c g
 Piezogaster vates (Stål, 1862) i c g

Data sources: i = ITIS, c = Catalogue of Life, g = GBIF, b = Bugguide.net

References

Further reading

External links

 

Articles created by Qbugbot
Nematopodini
Coreidae genera